The Crux of the Biscuit is a compilation album by American musician Frank Zappa, released in July 2016, originally intended to celebrate the 40th anniversary of his album Apostrophe ('). It is the fourth project in a series of 40th Anniversary FZ Audio Documentaries, following MOFO (2006), Lumpy Money (2009) and Greasy Love Songs (2010). The name is based on the same lyric from "Stink-Foot" that Apostrophe (') is based on—"the crux of the biscuit is the apostrophe."

Track listing

References

Frank Zappa compilation albums
2016 compilation albums